The United Kingdom held a national preselection to choose the song that would go to the Eurovision Song Contest 1970.

Before Eurovision

A Song for Europe 1970 
The show was held on 7 March 1970 and presented by Cliff Richard as part of the BBC1 series It's Cliff Richard!. Hopkin performed one of the six shortlisted songs each week, before performing all six in succession in the final. These performances were then immediately repeated. The votes were open to the public by post, with the results announced on 14 March, just a week before the Eurovision final itself. Welsh singer Mary Hopkin had been chosen as the UK representative back in August 1969, having made her name with his such as "Those Were the Days" and "Goodbye". At the final, Hopkin was backed by singers John Evans and Brian Bennett, with the orchestra conducted alternately by John Cameron and Johnny Arthey, who directed the orchestra in Amsterdam. Hopkin was allowed to select one song for the contest, this being "You've Everything You Need", while the other five were selected from over 200 songs put forward by songwriters. "You've Everything You Need" caused a minor scandal on the day of the UK final when the Daily Mirror reported that the publishers of that song had told all their staff to send in multiple votes. Whether votes had to be then adjusted by the BBC to avoid a scandal is unknown, but the song ended up being placed second-last. "Knock, Knock Who's There?" ultimately became the easy victor with 120,290 votes. The song was written by Geoff Stephens and John Carter. The votes presented below were only announced rounded up.

Chart success 
Hopkin recorded all six entries, with the top two placed being released as a single. Of the others, only a bootleg version of "You've Everything You Need" was ever available commercially. "Knock, Knock Who's There?" was released as a single and became a hit across Europe, peaking at No.2 in the UK, with the runner up "I'm Gonna Fall In Love Again" on the B-Side. Belatedly, it also became a minor US hit for her in 1972.

At Eurovision 
At the Eurovision final, BBC 1 broadcast the Contest with David Gell providing the television commentary, Tony Brandon provided the radio commentary on BBC Radio 1. The contest was also broadcast on British Forces Radio with commentary provided by John Russell.

Voting 
Every country had a jury of ten people. Every jury member could give one point to his or her favourite song.

References 

1970
Countries in the Eurovision Song Contest 1970
Eurovision
Eurovision